Barbara C. Hyland (born October 17, 1943 in Orange, New Jersey) is an American politician who represented the 1st Bristol District in the Massachusetts House of Representatives from 1992 to 2001. She was previously a member of the Foxborough, Massachusetts School Committee from 1977 to 1986.

References

1943 births
Republican Party members of the Massachusetts House of Representatives
People from Bristol County, Massachusetts
People from Orange, New Jersey
People from Foxborough, Massachusetts
Regis College alumni
Living people
Women state legislators in Massachusetts
21st-century American women